Joseph Locke (1805–1860) was a British civil engineer particularly associated with railway projects.

Joseph Locke may also refer to:

 Joe Locke (actor) (born 2003), a Manx actor
 Joe Locke (musician) (born 1959), an American jazz vibraphonist and composer
 Josef Locke (1917–1999), an Irish popular singer of the 1940s and 1950s
 Joseph Locke, penname of Ray Garton, an American author